The second season of Packed to the Rafters, an Australian drama television series, began airing on 30 June 2009 on the Seven Network. The season concluded on 24 November 2009 after 22 episodes. The second season aired Tuesdays at 8:30 pm in Australia and averaged 1,881,000 viewers. The season was released on DVD as a six disc set under the title of Packed to the Rafters: The Complete Season 2 on 3 November 2010.

The second season follows Julie and Dave Rafter through comic highs and soul-searching lows as they prepare for the unplanned but no-less welcome addition to their family of their new baby. We also explore the heart warming arrival into the Rafters world of Dave's birth mother Chel, opening in the process the door to further family revelations. We follow the tumultuous upheavals in the lives of all three Rafter children. Rachel embarks on a promising if-at-first feisty relationship with the cute young electrician who's begun working with her dad. Ben continues his determined pursuit of housemate Melissa's hand in marriage. Nathan, in seeking new career challenges in the music business, struggles to resist strong temptations that may well signal the end of his young marriage.

Cast

Regular
 Rebecca Gibney as Julie Rafter
 Erik Thomson as Dave Rafter
 Jessica Marais as Rachel Rafter
 Angus McLaren as Nathan Rafter
 Hugh Sheridan as Benjamin "Ben" Rafter
 Jessica McNamee as Samantha "Sammy" Rafter
 Michael Caton as Ted Taylor

Recurring and guest
 George Houvardas as Carbo Karandonis
 Zoe Ventoura as Melissa Bannon
 James Stewart as Jake Barton
 Caroline Brazier as Chrissy Merchant
 Justin Rosniak as Stuart "Warney" Warne
 Luke Pegler as Daniel Griggs
 Sarah Chadwick as Trish Westaway
 Kate Fitzpatrick as Marjorie Stevens
 George Spartels as Theo Karandonis
 Dina Panozzo as Rita Karandonis
 Belinda Bromilow as Libby Sanders
 Craig McLachlan as Steve Wilson
 Michael Booth as George Spiteri
 Ria Vandervis as Layla Soubrani
 Geoff Morrell as Tim Connelly
 Peter Bensley as Derek
Christian Barratt-Hill as Don Barrett
 Pedro Virgil as Dane
 Gillian Jones as Rachel "Chel" Warne
Sophia Katos as Artie
Hannah and Sebella Storey as Ruby Rafter
Mercia Deane-Johns as Grace Barton
 Kristian Schmid as Alex Barton
 Denise Roberts as Bonnie Bright
 Phoebe Tonkin as Lexi
 Kim Lewis as Toni (The older woman)

Episodes

{| class="wikitable plainrowheaders" style="width:100%;"
|-style="color:black"
! style="background: #fda817;" | No. inseries
! style="background: #fda817;" | No. inseason
! style="background: #fda817;" | Title
! style="background: #fda817;" | Narrator
! style="background: #fda817;" | Directed by
! style="background: #fda817;" | Written by
! style="background: #fda817;" | Original air date
! style="background: #fda817;" | Australian Viewers(millions)
|-

|}

Reception

Ratings

1 Viewer numbers are based on preliminary OzTAM data for Sydney, Melbourne, Brisbane, Adelaide and Perth combined.
2 Episode 1 of season 2 was aired in Sydney, Adelaide, Brisbane and Perth on 30 June to an audience of 1,520,000. Episode 1 was shown to Melbourne a week later to an audience of 665,000 taking the total viewers for episode 1 to 2,185,000
3 Episode 2 was played at 9:30 in Melbourne as part 2 of a 2-hour season premiere.

References

2009 Australian television seasons